Hopsons Creek is a stream located entirely within Geauga County, Ohio.

Hopsons Creek was named for Samuel Hopson, an early settler.

See also
List of rivers of Ohio

References

Rivers of Geauga County, Ohio
Rivers of Ohio